Dajiang may refer to:

Dajiang (food), Chinese food
Dajiang-class tender, Chinese naval auxiliary ship
Da-Jiang Innovations, or DJI, Chinese technology company
Da jiang, military ranks of China